Ghetto D is the sixth studio album by  American rapper Master P, released on September 2, 1997 on No Limit Records and Priority Records.

Chart performance
The album debuted at #137 on the Billboard 200. In Its second week the album then moved to #1 on the Billboard 200 and Top R&B/Hip-Hop Albums selling 260,000 copies in its second week. It was mainly on the strength of the two singles released; "I Miss My Homies" (US #25), "Make 'Em Say Uhh!" (US #22) became hit singles in the years 1997 and 1998. "Gangstas Need Love" samples Diana Ross's hit single "Missing You", while "I Miss My Homies" samples The O'Jays' song "Brandy" from the album So Full of Love. In 2008 "Make 'Em Say Uhh!" it ranked #26 on VH1's 100 Greatest Songs of Hip Hop. It ranked at #36 on Blender's list of the "50 Worst Songs Ever" In 2008, it ranked #94 on VH1's 100 Greatest Songs of Hip Hop. "Here We Go", featuring Fiend and Mystikal, was a b-side, released on the "I Miss My Homies" single. Though not a single, there was a video for the song Ghetto D that was aired on November 23, 1997, on both MTV & BET. The album was certified 3× Platinum on August 4, 2006, with 3,185,221 copies sold, according to SoundScan.

Track listing 

10th Anniversary Edition Bonus Tracks (2007)
Weed & Hennessy (feat. C-Murder & Silkk the Shocker)
Scream (featuring Silkk the Shocker)
Playa 4 Life (feat. Rappin' 4-Tay)
Make 'Em Say Ugh! (Instrumental)

Samples
"Bourbons and Lacs"
"Sexual Healing" by Marvin Gaye
"Gangstas Need Love"
"Missing You" by Diana Ross
"Ghetto D"
"Eric B. Is President" by Eric B. & Rakim
"I Miss My Homies"
"Brandy" by The O'Jays
"Make Em' Say Uhh!"
"Apache" by Sugarhill Gang
"Funkbox Party" by The Masterdon Committee
Pass Me da Green
"Intro and Main Title" by Fred Myrow and Malcolm Seagrave
"Stop Hatin'"
"Rumors" by Timex Social Club
"Tryin' 2 Do Something"
"For the Love of You (Part 1 & 2)" by The Isley Brothers

Charts

Weekly charts

Year-end charts

Certifications

Singles
I Miss My Homies

Make Em Say Uhh

See also
List of number-one albums of 1997 (U.S.)
List of number-one R&B albums of 1997 (U.S.)

External links
 Official Track Listing

References

Master P albums
1997 albums
No Limit Records albums